This is a list of active, dormant and extinct volcanoes in Cambodia.

Cambodia
 
Volcanoes